"Biarlah Rahsia" (Let It Be A Secret) is a song written and performed by Malaysian pop singer-songwriter Siti Nurhaliza and composed by Melly Goeslaw. The song was released as the first single from her eleventh album, Transkripsi. It earned the Best Song award at the Anugerah Planet Muzik in 2007. "Biarlah Rahsia" is, to date, Siti's most successful single from her Transkripsi album.

Background and writing
The song was originally composed and written by Melly Goeslaw. Siti changed the lyrics after she heard the song for the first time, and she was credited for re-writing the lyrics.. Siti's vocal range in this song is G3-E5.

Rumours had it that this song was produced as a response to the heavy media pressure in 2006 whether she will marry Datuk Khalid Mohamad Jiwa (commonly referred to by Datuk K) or not. The title of the song "Biarlah Rahsia" (Let It Be A Secret) speaks for itself.

Release
Siti premiered "Biarlah Rahsia" at the Anugerah Planet Muzik (a regional award show) in 2006 which was aired live from Singapore. The song was soon released to radio airplay in Malaysia.

Music video

The music video for "Biarlah Rahsia" was shot in Indonesia. It was directed by Rizal Mantovani (also the director of Siti's "Percayalah", "Bukan Cinta Biasa" & "Seindah Biasa" music videos). According to Siti, the music video features only beauty shots.

The video was first shown on Astro Ria's Muzik@RIA on 4 July 2006. The video received mostly positive comments from viewers.

In the video, Siti appears in a black gown while walking in a beautiful wooden house. We can see Siti in her white cloth writing lyrics in the second chorus of the song. In some parts of the video, the lyrics appear according to the song. Floral motives can also be seen from the beginning and until the end of the video.

Personnel
 Composer: Melly Goeslow
 Lyrics: Siti Nurhaliza
 Producer & Musical Arrangement: Aubrey Suwito
 Bass: Andy Peterson
 Mixing: Peter Chong

Charts

References

2006 singles
Siti Nurhaliza songs
Songs written by Siti Nurhaliza
Song recordings produced by Siti Nurhaliza
2006 songs